This article provides a summary of results for the general elections to the Canadian province of Quebec's unicameral legislative body, the National Assembly of Quebec (and its predecessor, the Legislative Assembly of Quebec). The number of seats has generally increased over time, from 65 for the first six elections, to the current high of 125.

The chart on the upper right shows the information graphically, with the most recent elections towards the right.

The Conservative party (blue) in 1936 merged into the Union Nationale (now defunct). The 1970s saw the arrival of the sovereignist Parti Québécois, to be followed by Québec Solidaire and the Coalition Avenir Québec (CAQ) in 2006 and 2011, respectively.

This article only covers elections since the Canadian confederation in 1867, when Quebec was created as one of Canada's provinces. For Quebec's first 15 elections as Lower Canada from 1792 to 1840, see Legislative Assembly of Lower Canada. For the 8 joint elections of Ontario and Quebec as the Province of Canada, from 1840 to 1867, see list of elections in the Province of Canada.

Summary of results

The table below shows the total number of seats won by the political parties in each election. It also shows the percentage of the vote obtained by each party. The winning party's totals are shown in bold. There have been five elections (1998, 1966, 1944, 1892 and 1886) in which the winning party did not have the largest share of the popular vote. Full details on any election are linked via the year of the election at the start of the row.

Pre-1936

Post-1936

Notes
  Includes all Independent Conservative candidates elected from 1875 to 1892.
  Results include the by-election on 20 May 2003 in the Champlain electoral district to break a tie in the original general election.
  Results include the by-election on 14 December 1998 in the Masson electoral district due to the death of PQ candidate Yves Blais on 22 November 1998.
  Results include the by-election on 24 October 1994 in the Saint-Jean electoral district to break a tie in the original general election.
  Includes Independent Liberal candidate; the 27 May 1912 election of Gustave Lemieux by acclamation in Gaspé; and the 15 July 1912 election of Joseph-Édouard Caron in the Îles-de-la-Madeleine.
  Includes the Independent Liberal candidate elected.
  Includes the Conservative candidate elected in the by-election held in Kamouraska on 11 February 1869.
  Power went back and forth a few times after the 1878 election. For most of that legislature, the Liberals controlled a minority parliament with the support of some Conservative members.
  The Action démocratique du Québec (ADQ) ran from 1994–2008. The Coalition avenir Québec (CAQ) was founded in 2011, merged with the ADQ (absorbing all of its sitting MNAs), and ran in its first election in 2012.

References

 
  (Votes)
  (Seats)
 

Quebec general elections
Elections, general